Kolkata Metro Line 3 or the Purple Line is a line of the Kolkata Metro. The   stretch from Joka to Taratala of the  line was inaugurated on 30 December 2022. It will connect Kolkata Metro Line 1 at Park Street in central Kolkata and run in parallel up to Esplanade in central Kolkata where it will connect Kolkata Metro Line 2 also. Line 3 is being built by Rail Vikas Nigam Limited.

Development
 
The project is getting delayed due to nonavailability of land for the construction of train depot at Joka. In 2019, RVNL was given the land required for building the depot and the construction for its boundary wall and land development started in February 2019. Tenders for its construction and plant & machinery were invited in April 2020.

Construction was further delayed in September 2018 due to the Majerhat Bridge collapse, the metro was being built right next to the bridge.

Tender for Majherhat to Esplanade underground section has been floated in 1st week of December 2019.

By 15 September 2022, the stretch from Joka to Taratala has been fully constructed and electrification has been done. Testing trials are underway from Joka to Taratala using the old decommissioned Metro Rakes. Eventually in service there will be new air conditioned metro rakes. The stretch from Majherhat to Esplanade is under construction.

Prime Minister Narendra Modi inaugurated the Joka-Taratala stretch, including Joka metro station of Kolkata Metro's Purple Line on 30 December 2022 in the presence of West Bengal Chief Minister Mamata Banerjee and Indian Railway Minister Ashwini Vaishnaw. Some students from schools like St Thomas Boys School were granted the rare opportunity to be the first ones to ride in this Joka-Taratala stretch after the inauguration.

List of stations

But, later the route was shortened and planned to terminate at Esplanade. A separate Depot is under construction in Joka. It is being built by RVNL and the tender has gone to Simplex Infrastructures. The extension of this line to IIM and Diamond Park for  has been sanctioned in the Budget of 2012-13 at a cost of Rs. 294.49 Cr. The execution of this work has been entrusted to RVNL.

There are 3 phases in this line-

 Joka to Taratala (Operational)
 Taratala to Esplanade (Under construction)
Diamond Park to Joka (Planned)

See also
 List of Kolkata metro stations
 Kolkata Metro Rolling Stock
 2018 Kolkata bridge collapse
 Kolkata Suburban Railway

References

Kolkata Metro lines
Kolkata Metro
750 V DC railway electrification